The tenth season of the American fictional drama television series ER first aired on September 25, 2003, and concluded on May 13, 2004.  The tenth season consists of 22 episodes.

Plot

New characters arrive in the form of medical student Neela Rasgotra, hapless resident Archie Morris, and Nurse Samantha Taggart who fills the void left by Abby who returns to medical school. The aftermath of Kovač and Carter's mission in Africa becomes a key story throughout the season, a Thanksgiving tragedy sees the end of Romano, Lewis copes with an unexpected pregnancy, Pratt's professionalism is tested again by his colleagues, Gallant is deployed to Iraq and Chen and Weaver both deal with personal losses. Kovač returns from Africa, determined to settle his affairs and return. Sam and Kovač share a relationship but Sam's ex-boyfriend arrives.

Cast

Main cast
 Noah Wyle as Dr. John Carter – Attending Physician
 Laura Innes as Dr. Kerry Weaver – Chief of Staff
 Mekhi Phifer as Dr. Greg Pratt – Resident PGY-2
 Alex Kingston as Dr. Elizabeth Corday – Associate Chief of Surgery
 Goran Visnjic as Dr. Luka Kovač – Attending Physician
 Maura Tierney as Abby Lockhart – Nurse Manager/Fourth-year Medical Student
 Sherry Stringfield as Dr. Susan Lewis – Attending Physician
 Ming-Na as Dr. Jing-Mei Chen – Attending Physician
 Sharif Atkins as Dr. Michael Gallant – Intern PGY-1 (episodes 1–18)
 Parminder Nagra as Neela Rasgotra – Fourth-year Medical Student
 Linda Cardellini as Nurse Samantha Taggart (episodes 5–22)
 Paul McCrane as  Dr. Robert Romano – Chief of Emergency Medicine (episodes 1–8)

Supporting cast

Doctors and medical students
 Sam Anderson as Dr. Jack Kayson – Chief of Cardiology
 Amy Aquino as Dr. Janet Coburn – Chief of Obstetrics and Gynecology
 John Aylward as Dr. Donald Anspaugh – Surgeon and Hospital Board Member
 Scott Grimes as Dr. Archie Morris – ER Second Year Resident
 L. Scott Caldwell as Dr. Megan Rabb – Director of Neo-Natology
 Glenn Howerton as Dr. Nick Cooper – ER Second Year Resident
 Bruno Campos as Dr. Eddie Dorset – Vascular Surgeon
 Maury Sterling as Dr. Nelson – Psychiatrist
 Paul Blackthorne as Dr. Jeremy Lawson – Invasive Radiologist
 Rossif Sutherland as Lester Kertzenstein – Medical Student
 Perry Anzilotti as Dr. Ed – Anesthesiologist
Shi Ne Nelson as Sheila – Medical Student
 K.T. Thangavelu as Dr. Subramanian
 Randy Lowell as Dr. Dan Shine

Nurses
 Ellen Crawford as Nurse Lydia Wright
Conni Marie Brazelton as Nurse Conni Oligario
 Deezer D as Nurse Malik McGrath
 Laura Cerón as Nurse Chuny Marquez
 Yvette Freeman as Nurse Haleh Adams
 Lily Mariye as Nurse Lily Jarvik
 Gedde Watanabe as Nurse Yosh Takata
 Donal Logue as Flight Nurse Chuck Martin
 Dinah Lenney as Nurse Shirley
 Bellina Logan as Nurse Kit
 Kyle Richards as Nurse Dori Kerns
 Liza Del Mundo as Nurse Severa
 Sumalee Montano as Nurse Duvata Mahal
 Nadia Shazana as OR Nurse Jacy
 Kelsey Oldershaw as Nurse Tess
 Tane Kawasaki as Nurse Claire
 Cynthia Cervini as Nurse Anna Waldron

Staff, Paramedics and Officers
 Abraham Benrubi as Desk Clerk Jerry Markovic
 Daniel Dae Kim as Social Worker Ken Sung
 Troy Evans as Desk Clerk Frank Martin
 Kristin Minter as Desk Clerk Miranda "Randi" Fronczak
Pamela Sinha as Desk Clerk Amira
Emily Wagner as Paramedic Doris Pickman
 Montae Russell as Paramedic Dwight Zadro
 Lyn. A Henderson as Paramedic Pamela Olbes
 Michelle C. Bonilla as Paramedic Christine Harms
 Demetrius Navarro as Paramedic Morales
 Brian Lester as Paramedic Brian Dumar
 Louie Liberti as Paramedic Bardelli
 Chad McKnight as Officer Wilson

Family
 Mark Valley as Richard Lockhart
 Cabria Baird or Brittney Baird as Ella Greene 
 Hallee Hirsh as Rachel Greene 
 Michael Gross as Mr. John "Jack" Carter 
 Thandie Newton as Makemba "Kem" Likasu
 George Cheung as Mr. Chen
 Kieu Chinh as Mrs. Chen
 Lisa Vidal as Sandy Lopez 
 Renee Victor as Florina Lopez
 Tito Ortiz as Carlos Lopez
 José Zúñiga as Eduardo Lopez
 Paul Dooley as Harry Lewis
 Oliver Davis as Alex Taggart
 Cole Hauser as Steve Curtis
 Joy Bryant as Valerie Gallant

Special appearances
 Mary McCormack as Debbie (in Kisangani)
 Zac Efron as Bobby (Dear Abby)
 Bob Newhart as Ben Hollander 
 Sarah Shahi as Tara King (The Greater Good)
 J.K. Simmons as Gus Loomer (Impulse Control)
 Jessica Chastain as Dahlia Taslitz (Forgive and Forget)
 Rocky Carroll as Mr. Walker (The Student)
 Kevin Sussman as Colin (episode 19 and 20)
 Patrick Kerr as George Deakins 
 Simone-Élise Girard as Nurse Gillian

Episodes

References

External links 
 

Second Congo War
2003 American television seasons
2004 American television seasons
ER (TV series) seasons